Sicilcassa S.p.A. also known as Cassa Centrale di Risparmio Vittorio Emanuele per le Province Siciliane, was an Italian bank based in Palermo, Sicily.

History
Cassa Centrale di Risparmio Vittorio Emanuele per le Province Siciliane was split into Sicilcassa S.p.A. and Fondazione Cassa Centrale di Risparmio Vittorio Emanuele per le Province Siciliane on 24 January 1992. In 1996 it faced insolvency.

In 1997 it was acquired by Banco di Sicilia.

See also
 Banco Popolare Siciliano
 Credito Siciliano

References

Banks established in 1861
Italian companies established in 1861
Banks disestablished in 1997
1997 disestablishments in Italy
Defunct banks of Italy
Companies based in Palermo
Capitalia Group